Goodenia triodiophila, commonly known as spinifex goodenia in the Northern Territory, is a species of flowering plant in the family Goodeniaceae and is endemic to arid inland areas of Central Australia. It is a stiff, wiry, much-branched, ascending perennial herb with needle-shaped or linear leaves on the stems and racemes of yellow flowers with a brownish centre.

Description

Taxonomy and naming
Goodenia triodiophila was first formally described in 1980 by Roger Charles Carolin in the journal Telopea from material he collected near Tom Price in 1970. The specific epithet (triodiophila) refers to species' often growing between Triodia hummocks.

Distribution and habitat
This goodenia grows on sandplains and rocky hills in arid regions of inland Western Australia, South Australia, the Northern Territory and western Queensland.

Conservation status
Goodenia triodiophila is classified as "not threatened" by the Government of Western Australia Department of Parks and Wildlife and as of "least concern" under the Northern Territory Government Territory Parks and Wildlife Conservation Act 1976 and the Queensland Nature Conservation Act 1992.

References

triodiophila
Eudicots of Western Australia
Flora of South Australia
Flora of the Northern Territory
Flora of Queensland
Plants described in 1980
Taxa named by Roger Charles Carolin
Endemic flora of Australia